This article contains information about the literary events and publications of 1507.

Events
August 26 – Following the death of Jean Molinet (see Deaths section), Jean Lemaire de Belges is appointed historiographer to the court of Charles, Duke of Burgundy.
September 15 – King James IV grants Walter Chepman and Androw Myllar a patent to found the first printing press in Scotland.

New books

Prose
Matthias Ringmann (probably) – Cosmographiae Introductio (to accompany Martin Waldseemüller's globe and map)
Francesco Spinacino –  (earliest known published scores for lute)

Poetry

Jean Lemaire de Belges – Les Chansons de Namur
Baptista Mantuanus
Mantuan Georgius
 (Charge and exhortation over the arms of infidels against Christian potentates)
Parthenese
Jean Marot – Le Voyage de Gênes

Births
January 25 – Johannes Oporinus, Swiss printer (died 1568)
April 13 – Konrad Hubert, German religious reformer and hymn writer (died 1577)
June 6 – Annibale Caro, Italian poet and translator (died 1566)

Deaths
July 5 – (Petrus) Crinitus (Pietro Crinito), Florentine Italian humanist scholar and Latin-language poet (born 1474)
August 23 – Jean Molinet, French Burgundian poet, chronicler and composer (born 1435)
November 6 – Pietro Casola, travel writer (born 1427)

References

1507

1507 books
Years of the 16th century in literature